Simon Mrashani Basiligitwa (born 18 April 1964) is a Tanzanian marathon runner.

He won the silver medal at the 1998 Commonwealth Games held in Kuala Lumpur in a time of 2:19:42 hours.

Achievements
All results regarding marathon, unless stated otherwise

External links

1964 births
Living people
Tanzanian male marathon runners
Tanzanian male long-distance runners
Athletes (track and field) at the 1998 Commonwealth Games
Commonwealth Games silver medallists for Tanzania
Commonwealth Games medallists in athletics
African Games bronze medalists for Tanzania
African Games medalists in athletics (track and field)
Athletes (track and field) at the 1995 All-Africa Games
Medallists at the 1998 Commonwealth Games